Curlew National Grassland is a National Grassland located in Oneida and Power counties in the state of Idaho, USA. The land used to make the grassland was purchased between the years 1934 and 1942. The primary goal of the grassland was to improve soil and vegetation in the area. The grassland is administered by the Forest Service together with the Caribou-Targhee National Forest from common headquarters located in Idaho Falls, Idaho. There are local ranger district offices in Malad City.

References

External links

 Curlew National Grassland - U.S. Forest Service
 Map of Curlew National Grassland - Idaho Fish and Game

National Grasslands of the United States
Protected areas of Oneida County, Idaho
Protected areas of Power County, Idaho
Protected areas established in 1934
Grasslands of Idaho